The chapel and Parish named St. Lorenzo in Produbas is located in a hamlet of St Lorenzo d'Albona in Istria County, Croatia. The hamlet of St Lorenzo d'Albona , Sv Lovreč Labinski  consists of two small settlements, Diminići  and Kobavići , which are located south of Albona or Labin . St Lorenzo in Prodibas was one of the 12 townships which divided the Agro Albonese , Labinština  into 12  Parishes or Župa  or 12 Comuni  or Municipality in 1632.
Today this chapel is called St Lorenzo di Albona or Sv Lovreč Labinski. 
The chapel was built in the 1608. and became a Parish in 1632.
In the front of the chapel there are two plaques or epigraph in Latin writing explaining the year it was built. The altar was crafted in Dubasnica a hamlet on the Island of Veglia /Krk located near Fiume /Rijeka Istria, Croatia, in the bay of Kvarner /Quarnero ,northern Adriatic golf, and near the neighboring island of Cres /Cherso in northern Croatia.
The altar was donated by a Priest Martin Viscović in 1663.

References

Chapels in Istria County